"Rise Up (Lazarus)" is a song performed by American Christian country band Cain. The song impacted Christian radio in the United States on April 17, 2020, as the lead single and title track from their debut studio album, Rise Up (2021). The song was written by Ethan Hulse, Logan Cain, Madison Cain, Nick Schwarz, and Taylor Cain. Nick Schwarz produced the single.

"Rise Up (Lazarus)" peaked at No. 4 on the US Hot Christian Songs chart.

Background
"Rise Up (Lazarus)" was released by Cain as part of their self-titled extended play on March 6, 2020. On March 20, 2020, the radio team of Provident Label Group announced that "Rise Up (Lazarus)" will be serviced to Christian radio in the United States, the official add date for the single slated on April 17, 2020. Logan Cain shared the story behind the song, saying:

Composition

Accolades

Music videos
The official lyric video of "Rise Up (Lazarus)" was published on Cain's YouTube channel on March 6, 2020. The Song Session video of the song was availed by Essential Worship on August 16, 2020, to YouTube. The official music video for "Rise Up (Lazarus)" was availed by Cain on October 2, 2020, to YouTube. The official audio video of the cover featuring Zach Williams showcasing the single's artwork was published on YouTube on January 15, 2021.

Track listing

Charts

Weekly charts

Year-end charts

Release history

References

External links
 
 

2020 songs
2020 singles
Songs written by Ethan Hulse